Shah Maleki (also Romanized as Shāh Malekī, Shāh Molkī, and Shāh Malakī; also known as Chāh Malakī and Shāh Mālīkī) is a village in Dorudfaraman Rural District, in the Central District of Kermanshah County, Kermanshah Province, Iran. At the 2006 census, its population was 483, in 101 families.

References 

Populated places in Kermanshah County